was a feudal domain under the Tokugawa shogunate of Edo period Japan, located in Tanba Province in what is now the west-central portion of modern-day Kyoto Prefecture. It was centered initially around Kameyama Castle in what is now the city of Kameoka, Kyoto. It is referred to as "Tanba-Kameyama Domain" to disambiguate it from Ise-Kameyama Domain.

History
The Kameoka area is located about 20 kilometers to the west of Kyoto, to which it is connected by the Kizugawa River. The area has long been regarded as the western gateway to Kyoto and was of strategic importance in protecting it from approach from both the San'in region and San'yo regions of western Japan. Recognizing the importance of this location, Oda Nobunaga's vassal Akechi Mitsuhide constructed a castle from which he conquered Tanba Province. It was from this castle that he later set out in 1582 to assassinate Nobunaga at the Honnō-ji Incident. After Akechi Mitsuhide's defeat by Toyotomi Hideyoshi, the castle was held by a number of members of the Toyotomi clan or various generals, who changed in rapid succession, including Maeda Gen'i, one of Toyotomi Hideyoshi's Go-Bugyō. Maeda joined the Western army at the Battle of Sekigahara, but although he was on the losing side, Tokugawa Ieyasu confirmed him as daimyō of the 50,000 koku Kameyama Domain under the Tokugawa shogunate. His adopted son, Maeda Shigekatsu was transferred to Yakami Domain in 1609. The domain then passed through a large number of fudai clans in its history, most of whom stayed for only one or two generations. 

In 1609, Okabe Nagamori was transferred from Shimōsa Province as a measure against Toyotomi Hideyoshi in Osaka Castle. The castle town was completed, and Kameyama Castle was rebuilt with the assistance of various western daimyō as a gesture of fealty to the Tokugawa. The Okabe were transferred to Fukuchiyama Domain in 1621. Later that same year, Matsudaira Narishige of the Ogyu-Matsudaira was transferred from Nishio Domain in Mikawa Province. His son, Matsudaira Tadaaki, was transferred to Bungo Province in 1634. The Matsudaira were replaced by Suganuma Sadayoshi of Zeze Domain. On the death of his son Suganuma Sadaakiara without heir in 1647, the domain passed to Matsudaira Sadaharu of the Fujii-Matsudaira, formerly of Kakegawa Domain. The clan ruled to 1686, when they were transferred to Iwatsuki Domain. The domain was then ruled from 1686-1697 by Kuze Shigeyuki, formerly of Niwase Domain. After his transfer to Yoshida Domain, Inoue Masamune of Gujō Domain ruled briefly to his transfer to Shimodate Domain in 1702. The Aoyama clan then ruled to 1748, with Aoyama Tadashige coming from Hamamatsu Domain, and his grandson Aoyama Tadatomo going to Sasayama Domain. 

Following the Aoyama, the domain came under the rule of the Katanobara-Matsudaira clan, who would continue to rule for the remainder of the Edo Period. This brought a period of political stability to the domain. The 7th  daimyō, Matsudaira Nobuyoshi served as  Jisha-bugyō, Osaka jōdai and rōjū during the tumultuous Bakumatsu period,and narrowly escaped assassination for his role as Ii Naosuke's assistant in the Ansei Purge.  He was one of the Japanese negotiators in the Anglo-Satsuma War. His successor, Matsudaira Nobumasa reversed the domain's position, and quickly joined the imperial side in the Boshin War. On July 27, 1869 the domain's name was officially changed to "Kameoka Domain" to avoid confusion with Ise-Kameyama Domain. In 1871, with the abolition of the han system, Kameoka briefly became "Kameoka Prefecture", which was merged with Kyoto Prefecture a few months later.

Holdings at the end of the Edo period
As with most domains in the han system, Tanba-Kameyama Domain consisted of several discontinuous territories calculated to provide the assigned kokudaka, based on periodic cadastral surveys and projected agricultural yields. 

Tanba Province 
58 villages in Kuwada District 
39 villages in Funai District 
Bitchū Province
 7 villages in Asakuchi District

List of daimyō 

{| class=wikitable
! #||Name || Tenure || Courtesy title || Court Rank || kokudaka
|-
|colspan=6|  Maeda clan, 1600-1602 (tozama)
|-
||1||||1600 – 1602||Minbukyō-hōin (民部卿法印)|| -none- ||50,000 koku
|-
||2||||1602 – 1602||Shuzen-no-kami (主膳正)|| Junior 5th Rank, Lower Grade (従五位下)||50,000 koku
|-
|colspan=6|  Okabe clan, 1609-1615 (fudai)
|-
||1||||1609 – 1615||Naizen-no-kami (内膳正)|| Junior 5th Rank, Lower Grade (従五位下)||32,000 koku
|-
|colspan=6|  Ogyū-Matsudaira clan, 1615-1634 (fudai)
|-
||1||||1615 – 1615||Ukon-no-jō  (右近将監)|| Junior 5th Rank, Lower Grade (従五位下)||22,000 koku
|-
||2||||1615 – 1634||Shinano-no-kami  (信濃守)|| Junior 5th Rank, Lower Grade (従五位下)||22,000 koku
|-
|colspan=6|  Suganuma clan, 1634-1648 (fudai)
|-
||1||||1634 – 1643||Oribe-no-kami (織部正)|| Junior 5th Rank, Lower Grade (従五位下)||41,000 koku
|-
||2||||1643 – 1648||Sakon-no-jo (左近将監)|| Junior 5th Rank, Lower Grade (従五位下)||41,000 koku
|-
|colspan=6|  Fujii-Matsudaira clan, 1648-1685 (fudai)
|-
||1||||1648 – 1667||Iga-no-kami (伊賀守)|| Junior 5th Rank, Lower Grade (従五位下)||38,000 koku
|-
||2||||1667 – 1683||Iga-no-kami (伊賀守)|| Junior 5th Rank, Lower Grade (従五位下)||38,000 koku
|-
||3||||1683 – 1685||Iga-no-kami (伊賀守)|| Junior 5th Rank, Lower Grade (従五位下)||38,000 koku
|-
|colspan=6|  Kuze clan, 1685 -1697 (fudai)
|-
||1||||1685 – 1697||Yamato-no-kami (大和守); Jijū (侍従)|| Junior 4th Rank, Lower Grade (従四位下)||50,000 koku
|-
|colspan=6|  Inoue clan, 1697 -1702 (fudai)
|-
||1||||1697 – 1702||Kawachi-no-kami (河内守); Jijū (侍従)|| Junior 4th Rank, Lower Grade (従四位下)||47,000 koku
|-
|colspan=6|  Aoyama clan, 1702-1749 (fudai)
|-
||1||||1702 – 1722||Inaba-no-kami (因幡守)|| Junior 5th Rank, Lower Grade (従五位下)||50,000 koku
|-
||2||||1722 – 1730||Inaba-no-kami (因幡守)|| Junior 5th Rank, Lower Grade (従五位下)||50,000 koku
|-
||3||||1730 – 1749||Inaba-no-kami (因幡守)|| Junior 5th Rank, Lower Grade (従五位下)||50,000 koku
|-
|colspan=6|  Katanobara-Matsudaira clan, 1749 -1871 (fudai)
|-
|1||||1748 – 1763||Kii-no-kami (紀伊守)|| Junior 4th Rank, Lower Grade (従四位下)||50,000  koku
|-
|2||||1763 – 1781||Kii-no-kami (紀伊守)|| Junior 4th Rank, Lower Grade (従四位下)||50,000  koku
|-
|3||||1781 – 1791||Kii-no-kami (紀伊守)|| Junior 4th Rank, Lower Grade (従四位下)||50,000 koku
|-
|4||||1791 – 1802||Kii-no-kami (紀伊守)|| Junior 4th Rank, Lower Grade (従四位下)||50,000  koku
|-
|5||||1802 – 1816||Kii-no-kami (紀伊守)|| Junior 4th Rank, Lower Grade (従四位下)||50,000  koku
|-
|6||||1816 – 1843||Kii-no-kami (紀伊守)|| Junior 4th Rank, Lower Grade (従四位下)||50,000  koku
|-
|7||||1843 – 1866||Kii-no-kami (紀伊守); Jijū (侍従)|| Junior 4th Rank, Lower Grade (従四位下)||50,000  koku
|-
|8||||1866 – 1871||Zusho-no-kami (図書頭)|| Junior 4th Rank, Lower Grade (従四位下)||50,000  koku
|-
|}

See also 
 List of Han
 Abolition of the han system

Further reading
 Bolitho, Harold. (1974). Treasures Among Men: The Fudai Daimyo in Tokugawa Japan. New Haven: Yale University Press.  ;  OCLC 185685588
 Genealogy of the Aoyama clan 
 Japan Gazette (1912). Peerage of Japan. n.p.
 Papinot, Edmond (1972). Historical and Geographical Dictionary of Japan. Vermont: Tuttle.
 Tsukahira, Toshio George (1966). Feudal Control in Tokugawa Japan: The Sankin Kōtai System. Boston: Harvard University Press.

References

Domains of Japan
1600 establishments in Japan
States and territories established in 1600
1871 disestablishments in Japan
States and territories disestablished in 1871
Tanba Province
History of Kyoto Prefecture
Fujii-Matsudaira clan
Matsudaira clan